World Turning is a studio album orchestrated by banjo player Tony Trischka. Genres vary wildly as do performers for each track. The title track of the album is a cover version of "World Turning", a song by Fleetwood Mac. The newgrass-style title track divides the album in two, the first half representing 19th century and earlier period banjo music, while the latter showcases 20th century banjo music and beyond.

Track listing

Personnel
 Darol Anger – Fiddle
 Barry Bales – Bass
 Jeff Berman – Percussion, Tambourine, Vibraphone
 Bill Berry – Guest Artist, Percussion
 Peter Buck – Bouzouki, Guest Artist
 Lindsey Buckingham – Composer
 William S. Burroughs – Guest Artist, Speech/Speaker/Speaking Part, Vocals, Voices
 Bob Carlin – Liner Notes
 Dudley Connell – Guest Artist, Guitar, Vocals
 Joe Craven – Percussion
 David Dennison – Engineer
 Patrick Derivaz – Engineer
 Gordon Gano – Guitar, Guitar (Acoustic), Guitar (Electric), Vocals
 Nancy Given – Design
 Matt Glaser – Fiddle
 Ed Goldstein – Tuba
 James Grauerholz – Producer
 Richard Greene – Fiddle
 Beryl Marriott – Fiddle
 David Grisman – Mandolin
 Gregory Heisler – Photography
 Ira Gluck – Photography
 Peter Herbert – Bass
 Aaron Hurwitz – Editing, Engineer, Mixing
 Kenny Kosek – Fiddle
 Alison Krauss – Fiddle, Guest Artist, Vocals
 Victor de Lorenzo – Drums
 Jim Maginnis – Drums, Trombone
 Mike Marshall – Guitar
 Roger Mason – Bass
 Bill McElroy – Engineer
 Christine McVie – Composer
 Clif Norrell – Engineer
 Van Dyke Parks – Lyricist, Piano, Vocals
 Todd Phillips – Bass
 Larold Rebhun – Engineer
 Farm Report – Producer
 Brian Ritchie – Bass (Acoustic), Didjeridu, Guitar (Bass)
 Cynthia Sayer – Drums
 Richie Stearns – Banjo, Claw Hammer Banjo, Vocals
 Adam Steffey – Mandolin
 David Stone – Engineer
 Evan Stover – Viola
 Syd Straw – Guest Artist, Vocals, Vocals (Background)
 Tony Trischka – Arranger, Banjo, Composer, Editing, Fretless Banjo, Gourd Banjo, Mixing, Primary Artist, Producer
 Violent Femmes – Guest Artist
 Buddy Wachter – Banjo
 Bob Ward – Editing, Engineer, Mixing

References

1993 albums